The men's field hockey tournament at the 2010 Asian Games was held in Guangzhou, China, from November 15 to November 25, 2010.

Squads

Results
All times are China Standard Time (UTC+08:00)

Preliminary

Group A

Group B

Classification 9th–10th

Classification 5th–8th

Semifinals

Classification 7th–8th

Classification 5th–6th

Final round

Semifinals

Bronze medal game

Gold medal game

Final standing

References

Results

External links
Official website

Men
Asian Games
2010